Joppa is an unincorporated community in Braxton County, West Virginia, United States.

The community derives its name from the ancient city of Joppa (Jaffa).

References

Unincorporated communities in Braxton County, West Virginia
Unincorporated communities in West Virginia